Sigismund Kęstutaitis (136520 March 1440) was the Grand Duke of Lithuania from 1432 to 1440. Sigismund was his baptismal name, while his pagan Lithuanian birth name is unknown. He was the son of the Grand Duke of Lithuania Kęstutis and his wife Birutė.

After the death of Kęstutis, he was a prisoner of Jogaila from 1382 to 1384. Sigismund was baptized in Catholic rite in 1383. In 1384, he escaped captivity and joined his brother Vytautas the Great, who allied himself with the Teutonic Knights. When Vytautas allied with the Teutonic Knights for the second time to fight Skirgaila, Sigismund was a hostage of the Teutonic Knights, together with his family from 1389 to 1398. He became Duke of Navahradak (1390–1440), and Starodub from 1406. He participated in the Battles of Vorskla and the Grunwald. After the death of Vytautas, he supported his cousin Švitrigaila in his fight against Poland, but later was convinced by nobles to join a conspiracy against him.

On 1 September 1432, Sigismund became the Grand Duke of Lithuania. He signed the Union of Grodno with Jogaila and ceded some territories in Volhynia and Podolia to Poland. However, Švitrigaila was still active and had the support of many Eastern Orthodox nobles. In 1434, in an attempt to attract support from these nobles, he issued a privilege to nobles of Eastern Orthodox faith, making their rights equal to those of noble Roman Catholics. He guaranteed that no noble, regardless of religion, could be imprisoned or punished without a court order. The privilege was an important development and accelerated formation of a feudal system.

Sigismund's army defeated Švitrigaila in the Battle of Wiłkomierz on 1 September 1435. The Livonian Order, an ally of Švitrigaila, suffered a major defeat. After strengthening his positions in Lithuania, he tried to loosen his ties with Poland and negotiated between 1438 and 1440 with Albert of Hungary (who was also the German king) for an anti-Polish alliance, but was killed by supporters of Švitrigaila (possibly led by Alexander Czartoryski) at the Trakai Peninsula Castle on 20 March 1440. Sigismund had one son, named Michael Boleslaw, who died shortly before 10 February 1452.

See also 

 List of Lithuanian rulers

References
 
 

1360s births
1440 deaths
Grand Dukes of Lithuania
Gediminids
Burials at Vilnius Cathedral
People in the Battle of Grunwald
15th-century monarchs in Europe
Date of birth unknown